George James Miller (1902–1940) was a Scottish architect, specialising in hospitals.

Life
He was born in Glasgow in 1902 the son of James Miller, architect, and his wife Emilina Henrietta Crichton.

Miller was sent to boarding school in Edinburgh, being educated at Fettes College. He then studied art and architecture at St John's College, Cambridge. Returning to Glasgow around 1924 he was apprenticed in his father's office at 15 Blythswood Square and did further studies at the Royal Technical College in Glasgow. Around 1932 he obtained a post as an assistant architect in the office of Sir Herbert Baker in South Africa. In 1936 he returned to Glasgow to allow his father to step down and the company was renamed James Miller & Son.

He died on 14 May 1940 after a brief illness, at which point his father wound up the practice. He was buried in Hillfoot Cemetery in Bearsden, Glasgow.

Family

He was married to Margaret Isobel Kincaid, daughter of James S Kincaid.

Main projects

Housing in Craigleith, Edinburgh (1930)
St Nicholas Church, Cardonald (1935)
BBC Broadcasting House, Belfast (1936)
Canniesburn Hospital and Convalescent Home (1936)
30 Old Kirk Road, Corstorphine, Edinburgh (1936)
Four houses, East Craigs, Edinburgh (1936)
Factory and offices for Michael Nairn & Co (linoleum) in Kirkcaldy (1936)
Balnagarrow, villa in Cramond (1937)
Nurses Home for Glasgow Royal Infirmary (1937)
Ear, Nose and Throat Hospital in Greenock (1937)
SMT bus garage in Glasgow (1937)
Remodelling of the Locarno ballroom on Sauchiehall Street (1937)
Almond Lodge, Edinburgh (1938)
Gilbert Bain Hospital, Lerwick (1938)
Numerous works in the 1938 Empire Exhibition, most notably the South Africa Pavilion (1938)
Shanks & Co, toiletware showroom and offices 189 West George Street (1938)
Millers Timber Truss Co Ltd, 7 Calderwood Road (1939)
Killearn Emergency Hospital (War Hospital) (1939)
Conversion of Gleneagles Hotel into an Emergency War Hospital (1939)

References
 

1902 births
1940 deaths
People from Glasgow
Scottish architects
People educated at Fettes College
Alumni of the University of Cambridge